Norman Chui Siu-keung (born 16 October 1950) is a Hong Kong actor. He was best known for portraying heroic protagonists in many martial arts films from the 1970s to 1980s and later portraying villainous roles in the 1990s. Chui was contracted with Asia Television during the 90's and is currently mostly acting in Mainland China.

Filmography

Films 
This is a partial list of films.
 1974 The Savage Five - Da Niu
 1977 The Battle Wizard - Gu Ducheng
 1977 Clans of Intrigue - Song Gang
 1978 Clan of Amazons - Jiang Chongwei
 1978 Legend of the Bat - Xiang Feitian
 1978 Vengeful Beauty - Ma Seng
 1978 Heaven Sword and Dragon Sabre - Wei Yixiao
 1978 The Brave Archer 2 - Qiu Chuji
 1979 Abbot of Shaolin - Li Jin Lun
 1978 Heroes of the East - Chang
 1980 The Sword - Lin Wan
 1982 Bastard Swordsman - Yun Fei Yang
 1983 The Denouncement of Chu Liu Hsiang - Murong Qingcheng
 1983 Duel to the Death - Hashimoto
 1983 Zu Warriors from the Magic Mountain - Heaven's Blade
 1984 Demi-Gods and Semi-Devils - Qiao/Xiao Feng
 1985 Hong Kong Godfather - Playboy Lung
 1988 The Dragon Family - Keung
 1988 City War - Ted Yiu
 1992 King of Beggars - Chiu Mo-kei
 2000 The Duel
 2016 Sword Master - Cult Leader

TV Series 
 1979 Reincarnated - Yun Fei Yang
 1980 On the Water Front - Yun Fei Yang
 1993 Reincarnated II - Yun Fei Yang
 1994 Heroic Legend of the Yang's Family - Yang Zongbao
 1994 The Great General - Yang Zongbao
 1996 The Snow is Red - Wan Tien Xing
 1998 The Return of the Condor Heroes - Lu Zhanyuan / Gongsun Zhi
 2000 State of Divinity - Xiang Wentian
 2001 The New Adventures of Chor Lau-heung - Xue Xiaoren
 2008 Legend of the Fist: Chen Zhen - Satō Kashirakawa (Zuoteng Bachuan)
 2010 The Patriotic Knights - Meng Shen Tong

Personal life
Chui married his first wife  in the early 1970s , they have a son Chui Jik-tung in 1973, who would later work as a content creator in the advertising and entertainment industries of Hong Kong. Chui and his first wife divorced in 1983.

Chui later married Hong Kong actress Sydney Yim, the younger sister of actress Michelle Yim, and they have a son Edward Chui and a daughter Erica Chui. Chui and Yim had since divorced in 1989.

In 2005 Chui married a Chinese woman Luo Yunqi, who was about 30 year his junior, and they have a daughter and a son.

References

External links

1950 births
Living people
Hong Kong male film actors
Shaw Brothers Studio
Hong Kong male television actors
People from Xinhui District
Hong Kong kung fu practitioners
Sportspeople from Guangdong
Male actors from Guangdong
20th-century Hong Kong male actors
21st-century Hong Kong male actors
Chinese male film actors
Chinese male television actors
20th-century Chinese male actors
21st-century Chinese male actors